Yimon Aye (born 12 July 1980 in Burma) is an American chemist and molecular biologist. Currently she is an Associate Professor of chemistry at EPFL.

Career 

Aye spent her early life in Burma. She completed her undergraduate studies in chemistry at the University of Oxford and obtained her master's degree in 2004. She joined Harvard University to study synthetic organic chemistry with David A. Evans, achieving her PhD in 2009. She then moved to Massachusetts Institute of Technology as a Damon Runyon Cancer Research Foundation fellow to work with JoAnne Stubbe. There she performed research into the regulatory mechanisms of ribonucleotide reductase. In 2012, she started as an assistant professor at Cornell University, where she began her work on redox-dependent cell signaling and genome maintenance pathways. During this time, she developed REX technologies, new methods to facilitate the study of unconventional electrophile-regulated stress signaling paradigms. REX technologies were one of the first approaches to forge direct links between upstream protein alteration by a reactive molecule and downstream responses.

In 2018, she was appointed as an Associate Professor of chemistry at EPFL. Since August 2018, she has been leading the Laboratory of Electrophiles And Genome Operation (LEAGO) of the Institute of Chemical Sciences and Engineering (ISIC) at EPFL.

Personal life
Yimon Aye's father Soe Thein is a former Commander-in-Chief of the Myanmar Navy. She has one brother, Aye Chan (b. 1973) and one sister, Thida Aye (b. 1973).

References

External links 

 Website of the Laboratory of electrophiles and genome operation

Cornell University faculty
Alumni of the University of Oxford
Academic staff of the École Polytechnique Fédérale de Lausanne
21st-century American chemists
American women chemists
American molecular biologists
Women molecular biologists
Harvard Graduate School of Arts and Sciences alumni
American women scientists
1980 births
Living people
American women academics
21st-century American women scientists